Tripyloididae is a family of nematodes belonging to the order Araeolaimida.

Characteristics 
The following traits define the genus: 

 the amphid is located posterior to the buccal cavity
 the spicule is wide
 the gubernaculum has little teeth
 the tail is conico-cylindrical
 the male reproductive system consists of a single testis
 the female didelphic has reflexed ovaries.

Genera

Genera:
 Arenasoma Yeates, 1967
 Bathylaimoides Allgén, 1959
 Bathylaimus Cobb, 1894
 Ingenia Gerlach, 1957

Species 
Tripyloides acherusius 

Tripyloides amazonicus 

Tripyloides amoyanus n. sp.

Tripyloides brevis 

Tripyloides caudaensis

Tripyloides gracilis

Tripyloides granulatus 

Tripyloides imitans 

Tripyloides mangrovensis n. sp.

Tripyloides marinus 

Tripyloides omblaica 

Tripyloides pallidus 

Tripyloides septentrionalis

Tripyloides soyeri

Tripyloides taafi 

Tripyloides undulatus

References

Nematodes